Lisa Josephine Carruthers  (née Powell) (born 8 July 1970 in Sydney, New South Wales) is a former field hockey forward, who was a member of the Australian Women's Hockey Team, best known as the Hockeyroos, that won the gold medal at the 1996 and 2000 Summer Olympics. She is currently a senior hockey coach at Melbourne High School.

Powell was awarded the Medal of the Order of Australia (OAM) in the 1997 Australia Day Honours and the Australian Sports Medal in June 2000.

References

External links
 
 Australian Olympic Committee

1970 births
Living people
Australian female field hockey players
Field hockey players at the 1992 Summer Olympics
Field hockey players at the 1996 Summer Olympics
Field hockey players at the 2000 Summer Olympics
Olympic field hockey players of Australia
Olympic gold medalists for Australia
Commonwealth Games gold medallists for Australia
Sportswomen from New South Wales
Olympic medalists in field hockey
Sportspeople from Sydney
Medalists at the 2000 Summer Olympics
Medalists at the 1996 Summer Olympics
Commonwealth Games medallists in field hockey
ACT Academy of Sport alumni
Field hockey players at the 1998 Commonwealth Games
Recipients of the Medal of the Order of Australia
Recipients of the Australian Sports Medal
Female field hockey forwards
Medallists at the 1998 Commonwealth Games